The Indian Cavalry Corps was a formation of the British Indian Army in World War I. It was formed in France in December 1914. It remained in France until March 1916, when it was broken up. The corps consisted of the 1st Indian Cavalry Division and the 2nd Indian Cavalry Division, and together with the Indian Corps it formed Indian Expeditionary Force A.

The high number of officer casualties had an effect: British officers who understood the language, customs, and psychology of their men could not be quickly replaced; as well, the alien environment of the Western Front had an adverse effect on the soldiers.

Hew Fanshawe, from the 19th Hussars, commanded the 2nd Indian Cavalry Division in 1914. He was head of V Corps from 1915 to 1916.

See also
Indian Cavalry Corps order of battle First World War
British cavalry during the First World War

Notes

Sources

http://www.greatwar.co.uk/ypres-salient/memorial-indian-forces.htm - Indian Forces Memorial, Ypres

Corps of British India
Corps of India in World War I
Military units and formations established in 1914
Military units and formations disestablished in 1916